Ishq 2020 (Urdu: عشق ٹونٹی ٹونٹی) is an unreleased Pakistani romantic comedy film directed by Najaf Bilgrami, produced by M.Khalid Ali and written by Asma Nabeel under the production of Crew Motion Pictures. The film stars Sanam Chaudhry, Mariam Ansari, Muneeb Butt and Furqan Qureshi in lead roles.

Cast
 Muneeb Butt
 Sanam Chaudhry
 Mariam Ansari
 Altaf Hussain
 Komal Aziz Khan
 Furqan Qureshi
 Nayyer Ejaz
 aftab iqbal

Release
The film is pending release. The first look poster of the film was released on 28 December 2015.

Production
Sajal Aly was initially cast for the lead role in the movie but due to her ongoing projects, the actress had to give up the project.

References

Pakistani romantic comedy films
Unreleased Pakistani films
Urdu-language Pakistani films